Spinomantis aglavei is a species of frog in the mantellid subfamily Mantellinae, endemic to Madagascar.

Taxonomy
This species was originally described in the genus Rhacophorus. It was transferred to the genus Boophis by Guibé in 1947, and subsequently to the genus Mantidactylus by Blommers-Schlösser in 1979. Dubois made this species the type species of the subgenus Spinomantis, which was elevated to genus-level in 2006.

Oskar Boettger described Rhacophorus sikorae in 1913, but this name was considered a junior synonym of Spinomantis aglavei by Barbour and Loveridge in 1946 and all subsequent works.

Habitat and ecology
This species occurs in subtropical or tropical moist lowland forests, subtropical or tropical moist montane forests, rivers, and swamps.
It is threatened by habitat loss.

References

aglavei
Endemic frogs of Madagascar
Amphibians described in 1913
Taxa named by John Hewitt (herpetologist)
Taxa named by Paul Ayshford Methuen
Taxonomy articles created by Polbot